Kazarion Fowler (born July 30, 1994), known professionally as Skooly, is a founding member of Atlanta-based rap group Rich Kidz. Branching off from Rich Kidz to pursue a solo career in 2015, Skooly has since released several solo projects. Skooly's recent releases have been under 2 Chainz' label T.R.U., starting with Skooly's label-debut album Baccwardfeelings in 2017.

Early career 
Skooly began his rap career when he was 14, co-founding collective Rich Kidz alongside Kaelub Denson aka Huncho Kae in 2008. Rich Kidz first mixtape, Money Swag, was released in 2009 via digital download. After releasing several mixtapes, Rich Kidz was signed to Columbia Records in 2012. After releasing music with Rich Kidz and Columbia in the early 2010s, Skooly released his first solo mixtape The Blacc Jon Gotti in 2015.

T.R.U. & 2 Chainz 
Also in 2015, Skooly  signed to 2 Chainz' label T.R.U. Immediately after announcing T.R.U., or The Real University, 2 Chainz released his mixtape Tru Jack City, upon which Skooly was heavily featured. Skooly continued to release solo mixtapes in 2016 with Trench Gotti and King Cosa. In 2017, he released his debut album BAcCWArdFeELiNgS, which featured 2 Chainz, Young Thug, and Kidd. Skooly's most recent release came as an EP, Don't You Ever Forget Me, released in February 2018, with just one feature - 2 Chainz.
He released his second album, Nobody Likes Me, on 5/22.

Discography

References 

Rappers from Atlanta
Living people
21st-century American rappers
1994 births
African-American male rappers
Columbia Records artists
21st-century American male musicians
21st-century African-American musicians